Tallinn University Academic Library is a research library in Estonia with information on a verity of fields, save for construction and agriculture. It is located in Tallinn, the capital city of Estonia.

Tallinn University Academic Library is a research libraries of Estonia in many fields of knowledge, except construction and agriculture. It is located in Tallinn, the capital city of Estonia.

The library was founded in April 1946 as the Central Library of the Estonian Academy of Sciences. The main building of the Tallinn University Academic Library was designed by architects Uno Tölpus and Paul Madalik and was built in 1963. Although the library is relatively young, the Library of St. Olaf's Church (founded in 1552) makes up the oldest part of the collections, including 56 incunables dating back to the 15th century and thousands of volumes published between the 16th and 19th centuries. Overall, the library's collection has over 2.6 million physical items. The number of readers is nearly 50,000.

Over the years the library has gone through several administrative changes. 1990s the library used name Estonian Academic Library. In 2003, library become a structural unit of Tallinn University.

The library collects and holds printed and other documents published in Estonia, creating as complete collections of these materials as possible. The library is entitled to an obligatory copy of each and every publication issued in Estonia. As one of the founding members of the Estonian Libraries Network Consortium (ELNET Consortium), the library is one of the leaders in the modernisation of the libraries in the digital era.

Location
The main building of the library is situated in the center of Tallinn, on Rävala puiestee 10. The library has smaller branches by the different colleges of the Tallinn University, including the branches in Haapsalu and Rakvere.

The modernist design of the main building was created by architects Uno Tölpus and Paul Madalik in 1963. The building is under protection as architectural heritage.

External links
 

Academic libraries in Estonia
Buildings and structures in Tallinn
Libraries established in 1946
1940s establishments in Estonia
Kesklinn, Tallinn
1946 establishments in the Soviet Union